Suchi Chaudhary  is an Indian politician and is a member of the 18th Legislative Assembly  and has earlier been part of the  17th Legislative Assembly of Uttar Pradesh of India. She represents the ‘Bijnor’ constituency in Bijnor district of Uttar Pradesh.

Political career
Suchi contested Uttar Pradesh Assembly Election as Bharatiya Janata Party candidate and defeated her close contestant Ruchi Veera from Samajwadi Party with a margin of 27,281 votes.

Posts held

References

 Year of birth missing (living people)
 Living people
 Uttar Pradesh MLAs 2017–2022
 Uttar Pradesh MLAs 2022–2027
 People from Bijnor
 Bharatiya Janata Party politicians from Uttar Pradesh
People from Bijnor district